The Military Medal is a high military award of Spain to recognise battlefield bravery.

The medal was established in 1918 by Alfonso XIII of Spain. Since then it is awarded to members of the Spanish military service independent of rank.

Notable recipients

Spanish Civil War
 Emilio Mola
 Adolf Galland (Condor Legion)
 Mohamed Meziane
 Werner Mölders (Condor Legion)
 Walter Oesau (Condor Legion)
 Wilhelm Ritter von Thoma (Condor Legion)
 Wolfram Freiherr von Richthofen (Condor Legion)
 Günther Lützow (Condor Legion)

Rif War
 Philippe Pétain (Commander-in-Chief of French Forces)
 Francisco Franco

References 
 Royal Decree 899/2001, de 27 July. BOE (14/08/01)  Accessed December 25 2012.

Military awards and decorations of Spain
Awards established in 1918